Mir Abdul Majid Abro is a Pakistani politician who was a Member of the Provincial Assembly of Balochistan, from May 2013 to May 2018. He was appointed as Advisor to Chief Minister and later appointed as Health Minister Balochistan.

Early life and education

He was born on 10 January 1981 in Dera Murad Jamali.

He has received a degree in Bachelor of Commerce.

Political career
He was ran for the seat of Provincial Assembly of Balochistan as an independent candidate from Constituency PB-28 Naseerabad-I in 2008 Pakistani general election, but was unsuccessful. He received 7,089 votes and lost the seat to a candidate of Pakistan Peoples Party (PPP).

He was elected to the Provincial Assembly of Balochistan as a candidate of Jamote Qaumi Movement from Constituency PB-28 Naseerabad-I in 2013 Pakistani general election. He received 7,783 votes and defeated a candidate of PPP.

References

1981 births
Living people
Balochistan MPAs 2013–2018
Jamote people